Attatha attathoides is a moth in the family Erebidae. It was described by Ferdinand Karsch in 1896. It is found in the Democratic Republic of the Congo, Madagascar, Malawi, Mozambique, the Seychelles, Tanzania and Zambia.

References

External links

Moths described in 1896
Erebidae